Lakshman Singh is the name of:

 Lakshman Singh (golfer) (born c.1952), Indian golfer
 Lakshman Singh (politician) (born 1955), Indian politician
 Lakshman Singh (Scouting) (1911-1994), Indian leader in the Scouting movement
 Laxman Singh, ruler of princely state of Dungarpur from 1918 to 1989